NASA Astronaut Group 20 (The Chumps) saw the training of nine mission specialists, and five international mission specialists to become NASA astronauts. These 14 astronauts began training in August 2009 and officially graduated as astronauts on 4 November 2011.

Mission specialists
Serena M. Auñón (1 flight)  
Soyuz MS-09
Flight engineer, Expedition 56/57
Jeanette J. Epps
 Mission specialist, Starliner-1 (future flight)
Jack D. Fischer (1 flight)
Soyuz MS-04
Flight engineer, Expedition 52/53
Michael S. Hopkins (2 flights)
Soyuz TMA-10M
Flight engineer, Expedition 37/38
Commander, SpaceX Crew-1 
Flight engineer, Expedition 64/65 
Kjell N. Lindgren (2 flights)
Soyuz TMA-17M
Flight engineer, Expedition 44/45
Commander, SpaceX Crew-4
Kathleen Rubins (2 flights)
Soyuz MS-01
Flight engineer, Expedition 48/49
Soyuz MS-17
Flight engineer, Expedition 63/64
Scott D. Tingle (1 flight)
Soyuz MS-07
Flight engineer, Expedition 54/55
Mark T. Vande Hei (2 flights)
Soyuz MS-06
Flight engineer, Expedition 53/54
Soyuz MS-18
Flight engineer, Expedition 64/65/66
Gregory R. Wiseman (1 flight)
Soyuz TMA-13M
Flight engineer, Expedition 40/41, Current Chief of the Astronaut Office

International mission specialists
Jeremy Hansen, Canada 
Norishige Kanai, Japan (1 flight)
Soyuz MS-07
Flight engineer, Expedition 54/55
Takuya Onishi, Japan (1 flight)
Soyuz MS-01
Flight engineer, Expedition 48/49
David Saint-Jacques, Canada (1 flight)
Soyuz MS-11
Flight engineer, Expedition 58/59
Kimiya Yui, Japan (1 flight)
Soyuz TMA-17M
Flight engineer, Expedition 44/45

See also
List of astronauts by selection
NASA Astronaut Group 21

References

External links
Current astronauts page
Retired astronauts page
Foreign astronauts page
Payload specialist astronauts page

NASA Astronaut Corps
Lists of astronauts